The Albany FireWolves are a professional box lacrosse team based in Albany, New York. They are members of the East Division of the National Lacrosse League that began play in the 2021-22 season at the MVP Arena. The team is owned by a group headed by former NLL player Oliver Marti.

The team relocated from Uncasville, Connecticut, where they were known as the New England Black Wolves. The Black Wolves themselves were a relocation of the Philadelphia Wings. This is also the second National Lacrosse League franchise in Albany after the Albany Attack, who played from 2000-2003 before relocating to San Jose where they were known as the San Jose Stealth.

The team was officially named the FireWolves on April 14, 2021 after an online naming contest was held. The final three names considered were Attack, FireWolves and Black Arrows. The team changed its original logo after hearing from Stony Brook University lawyers, who raised concerns about the original logo's similarity to the Stony Brook Seawolves logo.

Current roster

All-time record

Playoff results

Draft history

NLL Entry Draft 
First Round Selections

 2021: Patrick Kaschalk (16th overall)
 2022: Alex Simmons (4th overall), Will Johansen (7th overall), Tye Kurtz (17th overall)

References

External links
 Official Website

2021 establishments in New York (state)
 
Lacrosse clubs established in 2021
Lacrosse teams in New York (state)
National Lacrosse League teams
Sports in Albany, New York